Fijilive is an online newspaper and business and cultural directory in Fiji.  The site is owned by the Future Group of Companies owned by Fiji entrepreneur Yashwant Gaunder.

Fijilive is one of Fiji's largest websites. The site rose to prominence in May 2000 during the nationalist coup orchestrated by George Speight. While communication links with the outside world were cut off by the coup plotters, Fijilive was one of the few sources of news to reach the international audience. Since 2003 the site has undergone a massive transformation with a focus on infotainment. However, it remains a major supplier of Fiji news for an international audience.

Fijilive Dating is an online dating site which is part of Fijilive.com. Fijilive provides services and opportunities for single people to find their Fiji lovers online through Fijilive Dating.

Fijilive Real Estate is an online real estate site which is part of Fijilive.com. Fijilive provides services for real estate agents in Fiji to sell their products online. Not only this, but Fijillive Real Estate also provides essential information like the latest Mortgage Rates in Fiji, Constructions in Fiji, Fiji Real Estate Acts & Forms and even provides the latest news on real estate industry in Fiji.

See also

Culture of Fiji

References

External links
 Fijilive website
 Fijilive news
 Fijilive sports
 Fijilive rugby
 Fijilive football
 Fijilive business
 Fijilive entertainment
 Fijilive gallery

Fijian culture
Newspapers published in Fiji